Papilio grosesmithi is a species of butterfly in the family Papilionidae. It is endemic to Madagascar. The habitat consists of forests.

Taxonomy
Papilio grosesmithi is a member of the demodocus species-group. The clade members are:
Papilio demodocus Esper, 1799
Papilio demoleus Linnaeus, 1758
Papilio erithonioides Grose-Smith, 1891
Papilio grosesmithi Rothschild, 1926
Papilio morondavana Grose-Smith, 1891

References

Sources

External links
ARKive images

Butterflies described in 1926
grosesmithi
Lepidoptera of Madagascar
Butterflies of Africa
Taxonomy articles created by Polbot